The United States District Court for the Northern District of West Virginia (in case citations, N.D. W. Va.) is a federal court in the Fourth Circuit (except for patent claims and claims against the U.S. government under the Tucker Act, which are appealed to the Federal Circuit).

The District was established on June 22, 1901.

 the United States Attorney is William J. Ihlenfeld II.

Organization of the court 

The United States District Court for the Northern District of West Virginia is one of two federal judicial districts in West Virginia. Court for the Northern District is held at Clarksburg, Elkins, Martinsburg, and Wheeling.

Clarksburg Division comprises the following counties: Braxton, Calhoun, Doddridge, Gilmer, Harrison, Marion, Monongalia, Pleasants, Preston, Ritchie, and Taylor.

Elkins Division comprises the following counties: Barbour, Grant, Hardy, Lewis, Pendleton, Pocahontas, Randolph, Tucker, Upshur, and Webster.

Martinsburg Division comprises the following counties: Berkeley, Hampshire, Jefferson, Mineral, and Morgan.

Wheeling Division comprises the following counties: Brooke, Hancock, Marshall, Ohio, Tyler, and Wetzel.

Current judges 
:

Former judges

Chief judges

Succession of seats

See also 
 Courts of West Virginia
 List of current United States district judges
 List of United States federal courthouses in West Virginia

References

External links 
 U.S. District Court for the Northern District of West Virginia
 The United States Attorney's Office Northern District of West Virginia

West Virginia, Northern District
West Virginia law
Clarksburg, West Virginia
Martinsburg, West Virginia
Wheeling, West Virginia
1901 establishments in West Virginia
Courthouses in West Virginia
Courts and tribunals established in 1901